Johnson Crossroads is an unincorporated community in Monroe County, West Virginia, United States. Johnson Crossroads is south of Alderson and northwest of Union.

References

Unincorporated communities in Monroe County, West Virginia
Unincorporated communities in West Virginia